is a Japanese web manga series written and illustrated by Crystal na Yōsuke. It was serialized on Shogakukan's online manga magazine Yawaraka Spirits from April 2015 to July 2019, with its chapters collected in 12 tankōbon volumes. An anime television series adaptation by Creators in Pack aired from October to December 2017.

Characters

An office lady who appears to be calm and collected, but when she starts drinking, turns into a playful and cute girl. She is married to Sora, who occasionally gives her cocktails when she comes home.

A furniture designer, part-time bartender who is married to Chisato, whom he affectionately calls . He takes care of the house chores and prepares meals and cocktails for Chisato when she comes home.

Media

Manga
Love Is Like a Cocktail is written and illustrated by Crystal na Yōsuke. It was serialized on Shogakukan's online manga magazine Yawaraka Spirits from April 3, 2015 to July 19, 2019. Shogakukan collected its chapters in twelve tankōbon volumes, released from October 9, 2015 to September 12, 2019.

Volume list

Anime
An anime television series adaptation by studio Creators in Pack was announced on April 29, 2017. It aired from October 3 to December 26, 2017, on Tokyo MX and Sun TV networks. The chief director for the series is Hisayoshi Hirasawa, while the director is Saori Tachibana. Taichi Hatanaka served as the animation producer of the series, while Yuzuko Hanai is the director of photography. The opening theme titled "Don't Let Me Down" is performed by Cellchrome. Crunchyroll announced that it streamed the series with English subtitles. A fourteenth episode was streamed on October 6, 2018.

Episode list

See also
Onidere, another manga series by the same author
Otokonoko Zuma, another web manga series by the same author

Notes

References

External links
  
  
 

2017 anime television series debuts
Cooking in anime and manga
Creators in Pack
Crunchyroll anime
Japanese webcomics
Marriage in anime and manga
Romantic comedy anime and manga
Seinen manga
Shogakukan manga
Slice of life anime and manga
Webcomics in print